The Silence of the Lambs or Silence of the Lamb may refer to:

The Silence of the Lambs (novel), a 1988 novel by Thomas Harris
The Silence of the Lambs (film), a 1991 film directed by Jonathan Demme based on the novel and starring Jodie Foster and Anthony Hopkins
"Silence of the Lamb" (Veronica Mars), a 2005 television episode of Veronica Mars
Waldsinfonie: The Silence of the Lamb, a 1993 Autopsia CD

See also
Silentlambs